The MV Issaquah is an  operated by Washington State Ferries.

The ferry spent her early years on the Seattle/Bremerton route, then shifted around the system for a time, before being placed on the Southworth/Vashon/Fauntleroy route, where she has been pretty much ever since.

References

Washington State Ferries vessels
1979 ships
Ships built in Seattle